The Cuba men's national handball team represents Cuba in international handball competitions and is controlled by the Cuban Handball Association.

Tournament record

Summer Olympics
1980 – 11th
2000 – 11th

World Championship
1982 – 13th
1986 – 15th
1990 – 14th
1995 – 13th
1997 – 14th
1999 – 8th
2009 – 20th

Pan American Games

Pan American Championship
1980 – 1st
1981 – 1st
1983 – 1st
1985 – 1st
1989 – 1st
1994 – 1st
1996 – 1st
1998 – 1st
2000 – 2nd
2008 – 3rd
2010 – 4th

Central American and Caribbean Games

Caribbean Handball Cup
2013: 2nd

Nor.Ca Championship

IHF Emerging Nations Championship
2019 – 2nd
2023 – Qualified

Other Competitions
2015 Four Nations Tournament – 3rd
2016 Four Nations Tournament – 3rd

Team

Current squad
Squad for the 2019 Pan American Games

Head coach: Cuba Luis Enrique Delisle

Player statistics

Most capped players

Top scorers

Notable players
Carlos Pérez → Hungary
Julián Duranona → Iceland
Vladimir Rivero Hernández
Ivo Díaz 83 caps → Hungary
Rolando Uríos 79 caps → Spain
Julio Fis 28 caps → Spain
Rafael Capote ? caps → Qatar
Jalesky Garcia 11 caps → Iceland

See also
Cuba women's national handball team

References

External links
IHF profile

National sports teams of Cuba
Men's national handball teams
Handball in Cuba